Telouet Kasbah (Berber: ⵉⵖⵔⵎ ⵏ ⵜⵍⵡⴰⵜ;) is a Kasbah along the former route of the caravans from the Sahara over the Atlas Mountains to Marrakech. The kasbah was the seat of the El Glaoui family's power, thus sometimes also called the Palace of Glaoui. Its construction started in 1860 and it was further expanded in later years. The palace can still be visited but it is steadily becoming more damaged and is slowly collapsing. In 2010, work was underway to restore the property.

Location

The palace is located on the outskirts of the small Berber village of Télouet, in Morocco. Occupying a strategic position in the High Atlas, the occupants of the palace had the privilege of being on the passage of caravans and near major salt mines. The kasbah and the village are now accessible by the P1506 road which, coming from the north, is accessed by a junction near the Tizi n'Tichka, from the RN9 road that connects Marrakech to Ouarzazate.

History
  
The passage of the merchant caravans, which connected the desert with the large cities situated on the other side of the Atlas, and the proximity of the salt mines, made the wealth of the Pashas inhabiting Telouet. The current kasbah was built starting in 1860 by Mohammed Ibiyet, the head of the Glaoui clan in the High Atlas. Construction took 5 years and is said to have involved some 300 craftsmen brought from many parts of Morocco, including Fes. In later years, the kasbah continued to be expanded as the family grew in power and wealth. The craftsmen decorated the walls with zellij and carved stucco and painted the cedar-wood ceilings with colorful motifs, adding distinctive elements of the classical Andalusi-Moroccan style to local Amazigh (Berber) styles.

The support given to French by El Glaoui, often called the Glaoui during the French occupation in Morocco, earned him the reciprocal support of the French colonial authorities. At the height of his power, the Glaoui family had considerable wealth, making him one of the country's leading figures. But this commitment turned against him during the increasing rise towards the independence of Morocco. He died in oblivion in Marrakech in 1956. The funeral procession was presided over by Crown Prince Moulay Hassan ben Mohammed, the future ruler of Morocco as Hassan II. Since then, mainly because of such political connotation, the kasbah has been almost abandoned.

Tourism
The kasbah is still visited today, via local guides. Entry is monitored by a guard, who receives low entry fees.

See also 

 Dar el Bacha
Dar Glaoui
Kasbah Taourirt
 Moroccan architecture

References

Buildings and structures in Drâa-Tafilalet
Kasbahs in Morocco